Kings XI Punjab (KXIP) are a franchise cricket team based in Mohali, India, which plays in the Indian Premier League (IPL). They were one of the eight teams which competed in the 2017 Indian Premier League. The Kings XI Punjab drew an average home attendance of 20,001 in the 2017 IPL season.

Season standings

Match summary

Auction
The player auction for the 2017 Indian Premier League was held on 20 February in Bangalore.

Squad
 Players with international caps are listed in bold.

Support staff changes
 In December 2016, Sanjay Bangar stepped down as the team's head coach.
 In January 2017, Virender Sehwag was named head of cricket operations and strategy.
 In February 2017, J. Arunkumar was named batting coach.

References

Punjab Kings seasons
2017 Indian Premier League